Theodor Fischer was a German épée and foil fencer. He fenced in the 1928 Summer Olympics, and won two medals in fencing at the 1932 Maccabiah Games in Mandatory Palestine.

Biography
Fischer competed in the individual and team épée events at the 1928 Summer Olympics. In each, Fischer was eliminated in the second round (the quarter-finals). He came in 12th in individual epee. He defeating reigning Olympic épée champion Charles Delporte from Belgium, Elie Adda of Egypt, Georgios Ambet of Greece, Josef Jungmann of Czechoslovakia, Frederico Paredes of Portugal, and lost to among others gold-medal-winning Lucien Gaudin of France, Bertie Childs of Great Britain, Édouard Fitting of Switzerland, and Dan Gheorghiu of Romania.

Fischer finished eighth at the 1928 German Fencing Championships. He fenced for Dresdener Fechtclub.

He fenced at the 1932 Maccabiah Games in Mandatory Palestine, winning a silver medal in men's foil and a bronze medal in épée.

References

Year of birth missing
Possibly living people
Competitors at the 1932 Maccabiah Games
Fencers at the 1928 Summer Olympics
German épée fencers
German male fencers
German foil fencers
German Jews
Maccabiah Games competitors for Germany
Maccabiah Games silver medalists
Maccabiah Games bronze medalists
Maccabiah Games medalists in fencing
Jewish male épée fencers
Jewish male foil fencers
Olympic fencers of Germany